Skilift Col is a col in the mountain wall between the Griffith and Howe Glaciers, on the west side of Watson Escarpment. The col is 2 nautical miles (3.7 km) northeast of Mount Meeks and provides a shortcut to field parties. So named by New Zealand Geological Survey Antarctic Expedition (NZGSAE), 1969–70, because some members of the party used a motor toboggan here in a similar way to a ski-lift.

Mountain passes of Antarctica
Landforms of Marie Byrd Land